The Northwest Accreditation Commission (NWAC), formerly named the Northwest Association of Accredited Schools, is a non-governmental organization that provides accreditation to educational institutions in the Northwestern United States. The Commission accredits K–12, elementary, middle, and high schools; those offering distance education; non- degree-granting postsecondary institutions; and special purpose, supplementary education, travel education, and trans-regional schools in seven states in the northwestern United States. Formerly an independent entity based in Boise, Idaho, it is now a division of AdvancED.

The commission operates in seven states: Alaska, Idaho, Montana, Nevada, Oregon, Utah, and Washington. Now it operates in India also with collaboration with SERI India. The Northwest Commission on Colleges and Universities, which also serves this geographic territory, operates as the postsecondary equivalent of the NWAC.

History
The organization traces its history to 1917 when the Northwest Association of Secondary and Higher Schools was formed. In 1974 the association changed its name to the Northwest Association of Schools and Colleges. In 2000 it became the Northwest Association of Schools and Colleges and Universities, which disbanded and split into two separate organizations in 2004, with the Northwest Association of Accredited Schools handling the accreditation of schools and the Northwest Commission on Colleges and Universities handling the accreditation of institutions of higher education.

In 2005 the organization's practice of accrediting schools outside its primary service region attracted controversy after it accredited a school in New York that was found to be issuing high school diplomas without the necessary state authorizations that were supposed to be prerequisites for accreditation. Northwest Association officials explained that it had accredited schools located outside its primary service region because they were operated by an organization based in the region.

In January 2012 the Northwest Accreditation Commission became a division of AdvancED, which was formed by the North Central Association Commission on Accreditation and School Improvement and the Southern Association of Colleges and Schools Council on Accreditation and School Improvement.

On December 5, 2011, the NWAC Commission and Board of Trustees voted at the annual meeting to approve new bylaws that officially made NWAC a division of AdvancED. Beginning July 1, 2012 all operations of NWAC are under the governance of AdvancED through its Northwest Regional Office. AdvancED has also a regional office in Delhi, India by the name of School for e-Education Research and Innovation (SERI).

Sources and notes

External links
Northwest Accreditation Commission 

School accreditors
Education in the United States
United States schools associations
Organizations based in Boise, Idaho